Rupert L. Hoilette (born 24 June 1946 in Kingston, Jamaica) is a Jamaican former sprinter who competed in the 1964 Summer Olympics.

Outside of the Olympics, he was the 400 metres runner-up and a 4×400 metres relay gold medallist at the 1966 Central American and Caribbean Games. He also won a relay bronze at the 1963 Pan American Games. Hoilette was the 400 m champion at the 1964 British West Indies Championships.

References

1946 births
Living people
Sportspeople from Kingston, Jamaica
Jamaican male sprinters
Olympic athletes of Jamaica
Athletes (track and field) at the 1964 Summer Olympics
Athletes (track and field) at the 1966 British Empire and Commonwealth Games
Commonwealth Games competitors for Jamaica
Pan American Games medalists in athletics (track and field)
Athletes (track and field) at the 1963 Pan American Games
Pan American Games bronze medalists for Jamaica
Central American and Caribbean Games gold medalists for Jamaica
Competitors at the 1966 Central American and Caribbean Games
Central American and Caribbean Games medalists in athletics
Medalists at the 1963 Pan American Games
20th-century Jamaican people
21st-century Jamaican people